Romeo Ricardo Wouden (born 24 December 1970) is a Dutch former professional footballer who played as a left winger.

Career
Wouden was born in Amsterdam, Netherlands. He made his Eerste Divisie league debut with FC Dordrecht during the 1988–89 season and played his last Eerste Divisie league game  with club Sparta Rotterdam during the 1999–2000 season.

References

External links

 voetbal international profile

1970 births
Living people
Association football wingers
Dutch footballers
Footballers from Amsterdam
FC Dordrecht players
SC Heerenveen players
Boavista F.C. players
C.D. Veracruz footballers
Sparta Rotterdam players
Eredivisie players
Eerste Divisie players
Liga MX players
Primeira Liga players
Dutch expatriate sportspeople in Mexico
Dutch expatriate footballers
Expatriate footballers in Mexico
Expatriate footballers in Portugal